Roachill is a hamlet in the civil parish of Knowstone in the North Devon district of Devon, England.

Hamlets in Devon